Phalaena is an obsolete genus of Lepidoptera used by Carl Linnaeus to house most moths.

Phalaena was one of three genera used by Linnaeus to cover all Lepidoptera. Papilio included all butterflies at that time, Sphinx included all hawk moths, and Phalaena included all the remaining moths. The type species was Phalaena typica (now Naenia typica in the family Noctuidae).

Seven subgenera were raised to the rank of genus as follows:
Alucita Linnaeus, 1767 – Alucitidae
Attacus Linnaeus, 1767 – Saturniidae
Bombyx Linnaeus, 1758 – Bombycidae
Geometra Linnaeus, 1758 – Geometridae
Noctua Linnaeus, 1758 – Noctuidae
Pyralis Linnaeus, 1758 – Pyralidae
Tinea Linnaeus, 1758 – Tineidae
Tortrix Linnaeus, 1758 – Tortricidae

References 

Obsolete arthropod taxa
Moth genera